Zeebee, born 29 June 1965 in Aalen, Germany, real name Eva Engel, is an Austrian singer-songwriter, composer and music producer. She creates sounds and songs with a broad variety of styles, such as jazz, pop, electronica, acoustic music and classical music.

Life and career
zeebee has been recording herself since the age of five, touring with Birmingham's Pigbag aged seventeen, releasing records on the Swiss label Off Course with her band D-Sire in the late 80's. Then starting to work as a ghostwriter, copywriting and taking flying lessons, raising two families and recording her musical ideas in her own studio in Austria.
In 1999 zeebee (= "cb", relates to cyberbabe) started to work via the internet with diverse songwriters from all over the world.  Since the release of her debut Chemistry on the Independent label Angelika Köhlermann in January 2004, zeebee received impressive press and radio reviews all over the world. Priorities, her second album, was written in 2004 and 2005 and released in February 2006 on Angelika Köhlermann/Monkey Music.
In June 2007, zeebee co-authored and was featured on the album Ballroom Stories with Waldeck.

zeebee has toured as a solo-artist, with a band, and as singer of Klaus Waldeck's band. Her third solo-album Be My Sailor was released on 19 March 2010 by Dope Noir, Vienna.

Discography
 1987 D-Sire Moving Back And Forward, Label: Off Course
 2003 Tender EP, Label: zeebeemusic
 2004 Chemistry, Label: Angelika Köhlermann
 2005 Cartoonboom Video EP, Label: Angelika Köhlermann
 2006 Priorities, Label: Angelika Köhlermann/Monkey Music
 2007 Ballroom Stories, Label: Dope Noir
 2010 In Peace We Live EP, Label: Dope Noir
 2010 Be My Sailor, Label: Dope Noir

External links
 Official MySpace site

1965 births
Living people
Alternative rock musicians
20th-century Austrian women singers
20th-century Austrian women musicians
Austrian songwriters
English-language singers from Austria
People from Aalen
21st-century Austrian women singers
21st-century Austrian women musicians